Manaudou is a French surname. Notable people with the surname include:

 Florent Manaudou (born 1990), French swimmer
 Laure Manaudou (born 1986), French swimmer
  (born 1985), French swimming coach

French-language surnames